The 1992 Los Angeles Dodgers season was the 103rd for the franchise in Major League Baseball, and their 35th season in Los Angeles, California.

Despite boasting what was nicknamed the "Outfield of Dreams", being manned by Eric Davis, Brett Butler, and Darryl Strawberry, injuries to key players and slumps from others contributed to the franchise's worst season since moving to Los Angeles with 63 wins and 99 losses for a last place finish in the NL West, regressing 30 games from the previous season; it was their worst season since 1908 when they were known as the “Brooklyn Superbas”. It was the first time the Dodgers lost 90 games in a season since 1944, and the first time they did so as a Los Angeles team. Additionally, the Dodgers cancelled four home games due to the L.A. Riots.

Despite the poor finish, the Dodgers had some hope for the future as first baseman Eric Karros won the National League Rookie of the Year Award, the first of five consecutive Dodger players to do so. The 1992 season also saw the Dodgers drop television station KTTV Ch.11 as their chief broadcaster of Dodger baseball, ending a 34 year, 35 consecutive season association with that station.

Offseason
November 27, 1991: Acquired Eric Davis and Kip Gross from the Cincinnati Reds for Tim Belcher and John Wetteland.
December 11, 1991: Acquired Rudy Seánez from the Cleveland Indians for Dennis Cook and Mike Christopher
December 11, 1991: Acquired Todd Benzinger from the Kansas City Royals for Chris Gwynn and Domingo Mota

Regular season

Season standings

Record vs. opponents

Opening Day lineup

Notable transactions
June 27, 1992: Acquired Mike Sodders from the Chicago Cubs for Kal Daniels
July 2, 1992: Acquired Steve Searcy and Julio Peguero from the Philadelphia Phillies for Stan Javier
July 30, 1992: Juan Samuel was released by the Los Angeles Dodgers.

Roster

Starting Pitchers stats
Note: G = Games pitched; GS = Games started; IP = Innings pitched; W/L = Wins/Losses; ERA = Earned run average; BB = Walks allowed; SO = Strikeouts; CG = Complete games

Relief Pitchers stats
Note: G = Games pitched; GS = Games started; IP = Innings pitched; W/L = Wins/Losses; ERA = Earned run average; BB = Walks allowed; SO = Strikeouts; SV = Saves

Batting Stats
Note: Pos = Position; AB = At bats; Avg. = Batting average; R = Runs scored; H = Hits; HR = Home runs; RBI = Runs batted in; SB = Stolen bases

1992 Awards
1992 Major League Baseball All-Star Game
Mike Sharperson reserve
 Rookie of the Year Award
Eric Karros
Baseball Digest Rookie All-Stars
Eric Karros
TSN Rookie of the Year Award
Eric Karros
NL Player of the Month
Brett Butler (July 1992)
NL Player of the Week
Tom Candiotti (Apr. 13–19)
Brett Butler (July 20–26)
Eric Karros (July 27 – Aug. 2)
Kevin Gross (Aug. 17–23)

Farm system

Major League Baseball Draft

The Dodgers selected 53 players in this draft. Of those, only one of them would eventually play Major League baseball. The Dodgers lost their first round pick to the Toronto Blue Jays as a result of their signing free agent Tom Candiotti but gained two supplemental first round picks, a second round pick and a third round pick as compensation for departing free agents Eddie Murray and Mike Morgan.

With their first pick, the Dodgers selected catcher Ryan Luzinski from Holy Cross High School. The son of former Major Leaguer Greg Luzinski, he was a promising power hitter when he spurned a letter of intent with the University of Miami to sign with the Dodgers. However, he never quite lived up to his promise. Blocked by Mike Piazza's ascent with the Dodgers, he bounced around the teams farm system until a trade to the Baltimore Orioles in 1997. In eight minor league seasons, he hit .265 with 49 home runs and 296 RBI but could never make the move from AAA to the Majors.

The other first round pick, outfielder Mike Moore from UCLA also failed to advance, he hit .242 in 912 big league games over 14 seasons (six of which were in the independent leagues).

The only player from this draft class to make the Majors was infielder Keith Johnson from the University of the Pacific. He appeared in six games for the 2000 Anaheim Angels and had two hits in four at-bats. He would later become a AAA manager in the Angels system for the Salt Lake Bees.

References

External links 
1992 Los Angeles Dodgers uniform
Los Angeles Dodgers official web site
Baseball-Reference season page
Baseball Almanac season page

Los Angeles Dodgers seasons
Los Angeles Dodgers
Los Angeles Dodgers